Mina Mumtaz Anwar (born 20 September 1969) is a British actress and singer. She is best known for her roles as Constable Maggie Habib in The Thin Blue Line, and Gita Chandra in The Sarah Jane Adventures.

Early life
Anwar was born in Church, Lancashire in 1969. She was educated at Accrington Moorhead High School, and gained an A level in Theatre in Performance at the Accrington and Rossendale College in 1988 before training at the Mountview Academy of Theatre Arts in London.

Acting career
She played Police Constable Maggie Habib in the TV situation comedy The Thin Blue Line, first shown on BBC 1 from 1995 to 1996.

Other roles include the recurring part of Sandra Malik in The Bill in 2003, Sister Zita Khan in Doctors and Nurses and Selena Sharp in Scoop. She also performed as the storyteller in Razzledazzle on the CBeebies channel.

Anwar appeared in the Channel 4 drama Shameless, and as a supporting character in children's sci-fi drama The Sarah Jane Adventures, in which she played Gita Chandra, the mother of character Rani Chandra, from its second to fifth series. She was also in the BBC drama show The Invisibles. Anwar appeared in Coronation Street as the ex-wife of Dev Alahan, the corner-shop owner, and in No Angels.

She starred in The Infidel as the woman in the black burqa, and portrayed Trudy Rehmann in the Nickelodeon series House of Anubis. She has appeared in a number of BBC TV dramas and sitcoms, such as The Wright Way, in which she plays the only female health-and-safety officer, Malika Maha, and in an episode of Upstart Crow where she portrayed one of the three witches from Macbeth. She appeared in the 2014 dramas Happy Valley and In the Club and the ghost tale Remember Me. In 2014 she portrayed Lauren in The Beneficiary, episode 5 of series 6 of the BBC's series of 45-minute stand-alone dramas Moving On.

In 2017 she originated the role of Ray in the new musical Everybody's Talking About Jamie at the Crucible Theatre, Sheffield, and continued her role for the West End transfer.

Anwar appeared in Series 10 of Doctor Who in 2017.

In 2018 she played Miss Marigold Mould in Series 2 of The Worst Witch.

Other activities
Anwar is a classically trained mezzo soprano. She sings big band jazz and sings backing vocals on occasions for The Charlatans.

Filmography

Film

Television

Audio

References

External links
 
 Mina Anwar interview for TV to Go

1969 births
Living people
Alumni of the Mountview Academy of Theatre Arts
People from Church, Lancashire
English people of Pakistani descent
British film actors of Pakistani descent